American Housewife is an American television sitcom that aired  on ABC from October 11, 2016, to March 31, 2021. It is created and written by Sarah Dunn and co-executive produced with Aaron Kaplan, Kenny Schwartz, Rick Wiener, and for the pilot only Ruben Fleischer. It is a Kapital Entertainment–ABC Signature co-production.

In May 2021, the series was canceled after five seasons.

Premise

The series chronicles the daily life of Katie Otto, a wife and mother who tries to maintain her sense of self and family while dealing with the wealthy, pretentious, arrogant housewives and their privileged children in her new hometown of Westport, Connecticut. Compared to the other residents who own big houses, Katie and her family are renters of a more modest home. She lives with Greg, her level-headed husband who is a university professor of history, and their three children. Taylor is their athletic, headstrong, but somewhat dimwitted oldest daughter who wants to fit in with her peers; Oliver is their savvy, ambitious, and snarky middle child; and Anna-Kat, sweet but obsessive-compulsive, is the youngest and Katie's blatant favorite. Katie frequently vents her frustration to and seeks advice from her two closest friends: Doris, whose strict parenting style sharply contrasts with Katie's; and Angela, a divorced lesbian mother and lawyer with a calm parenting style.

Episodes

Cast

Main cast
Katy Mixon as Kate "Katie" Otto
Diedrich Bader as Greg Otto, Katie's husband
Johnny Sequoyah (pilot) and Meg Donnelly (since episode 2) as Taylor Betsy Ross Otto, Katie's and Greg's teenage daughter
Daniel DiMaggio as Oliver Duke Otto, Katie's and Greg's teenage son and middle child
Julia Butters (seasons 1–4) and Giselle Eisenberg (season 5) as Anna-Kat Liberty Bell Otto, Katie's and Greg's youngest daughter
Ali Wong as Doris, one of Katie's best friends
Carly Hughes as Angela (seasons 1–4 & season 5 episode 1), one of Katie's best friends

Recurring cast
Leslie Bibb as Viv, Katy's neighbor
Jessica St. Clair as Chloe Brown Mueller, Katie's nemesis
Wendie Malick as Kathryn, Katie's mother
Logan Pepper as Cooper Bradford, Oliver's wealthy best friend whose parents are almost always out of town. He moves in with the Ottos in season 5.
Amarr M. Wooten as Eyo (seasons 1–2, 5), Taylor's former boyfriend
Evan O'Toole as Franklin, Anna-Kat's best friend
Carly Craig as Tara Summers
Sara Rue as Nancy Granville
Jeannette Sousa as Suzanne
Barret Swatek as Sage
Jerry Lambert as Principal Ablin
Peyton Meyer as Trip Windsor (seasons 2–5), Taylor's boyfriend
George Hamilton as Spencer Blitz (seasons 2–3), neighbor and one-time billionaire investor who has just returned home, having been out on house arrest after spending 20 years in federal prison
Nikki Hahn as Gina (seasons 2–3), Oliver's first girlfriend and fellow ballet dancer
Bruno Amato as Louie Tuscadero (seasons 2–3), Gina's uncle and owner of Tuscadero's Pizza
Ravi Patel as Grant (seasons 2–3), Greg's assistant
Julie Meyer as Maria, Chloe Brown Mueller's employee, later Principal Ablin's wife
Jason Dolley as Kevin (seasons 3–4), Katie's co-worker at the party planning agency where she works
Milo Manheim as Pierce (season 3), Taylor's love interest during her brief breakup from Trip
Reylynn Caster as Brie (seasons 3–4), Oliver's second girlfriend
Matt Shively as Lonnie Spears (season 4–5), a famous YouTuber who hires Greg to ghostwrite his autobiography; he later helps Greg with his City Council campaign
Jim Rash as Walker Montgomery (season 5), a waiter at Katie's "second breakfast" cafe; he is from a wealthy family but forced to wait tables as punishment
Holly Robinson Peete as Tami Gaines (season 5), Katie's close friend from before her move to Westport
Kyrie McAlpin as Grace Gaines (season 5), Tami's youngest and most troublesome child
Chibuikem Uche as Andre (season 5), a teaching assistant in Taylor's college philosophy class, with whom she starts to bond
Jake Choi as J.D. (season 5), a luxury hotel manager and aspiring father recently divorced from his husband, who becomes Katie's and Tami's friend
Tenzing Norgay Trainor as Trevor (seasons 4–5), Oliver's classmate with whom he develops a business idea

Guest cast

Kate Flannery as Crossing Guard Sandy
Jenny O'Hara as Mrs. Smith
Timothy Omundson as Stan Lawton, Chloe's ex-husband
Jay Mohr as Alan, Viv's ex-husband
Will Sasso as Billy, Katie's childhood best friend
Tiffani Thiessen as Celeste, Angela's ex-wife
Barry Bostwick as Thomas Otto, Greg's father
Julia Duffy as Amanda Otto, Greg's mother
Mallory Jansen as Nina, Oliver's ballet teacher
Bebe Wood as Ellen
Nathan Fillion as himself
Victoria Justice as Harper
Patrick Duffy as Marty, Katie's father
Cheyenne Jackson as Johnny Diamond
Ryan Seacrest as himself
Katy Perry as herself
Luke Bryan as himself
Lionel Richie as himself
Thomas Lennon as Simon
Vanessa Lachey as Crissy
Alessandra Ambrosio as herself
Alex Landi as himself
Kelly Ripa as Whitney
Drew Carey as Mr. Green
Ryan Stiles as Bill Doty
Kathy Kinney as Lunch Lady
Ed Weeks as British Greg Otto
Ian Gomez as Brecken Phillips
Lisa Vanderpump as herself
Madison Thompson as Lindsey Coolidge
Jessica Walter as Margaret
Joel McHale as Doyle Bradford

Production

Development
On January 28, 2016, it was announced that ABC had given the production a pilot order as The Second Fattest Housewife In Westport. The episode was written by Sarah Dunn who was expected to executive produce alongside Aaron Kaplan, Kenny Schwartz and Rick Wiener. Production companies involved with the pilot include Eight Sisters Productions, Weiner & Schwartz Productions, Kapital Entertainment, and ABC Studios. On May 12, 2016, ABC officially ordered the pilot to series. A few days later, it was announced that the series, now titled American Housewife, would premiere on October 11, 2016, and aired on Tuesdays at 9:30 P.M. On November 4, 2016, ABC picked up the series for a full season of 22 episodes and on December 13, an additional episode was ordered. On May 11, 2017, ABC renewed the series for a second season, which premiered on September 27, 2017. On May 11, 2018, ABC renewed the series for a third season of 23 episodes, which premiered on September 26, 2018.

On March 14, 2020, production on the fourth season was shut down following the impact of COVID-19, reducing season four from 21 episodes to 20. On May 21, 2020, ABC renewed the series for a fifth season, which premiered on October 28, 2020. On May 14, 2021, ABC canceled the series after five seasons.  The cancellation was somewhat unexpected, as season 5 ended with multiple cliffhangers.

Casting
On February 17, 2016, it was announced that Katy Mixon had been cast in the pilot's lead role. In March 2016, it was reported that Carly Hughes, Ali Wong and Diedrich Bader had also joined the pilot's main cast. On June 27, 2016, it was announced that Meg Donnelly had been cast to replace Johnny Sequoyah in the pilot role of Taylor, oldest daughter of the Katie and Greg characters.

On September 11, 2020, it was reported that Julia Butters was leaving the series ahead of its fifth season, reportedly to pursue other opportunities; the role of Anna-Kat was recast with Giselle Eisenberg. In November, Carly Hughes announced she had also left ahead of the fifth season, due to a toxic work environment. She appeared in the fifth-season premiere, the majority of which was filmed before production shut down in March. Following Hughes' departure, Holly Robinson Peete was cast in a recurring role meant to fill the void.

Syndication
On September 21, 2020, CMT began airing reruns of American Housewife.
On September 12, 2022, the series entered syndication in local markets, covering roughly 85% of the United States.

Reception

Critical response
American Housewife has received mixed reviews from television critics, with Katy Mixon's performance being praised as the show's highlight. Review aggregator website Rotten Tomatoes reported an approval rating of 58%, based on 38 reviews, with an average rating of 6.14/10. The site's critical consensus reads, "American Housewife is boosted by a strong and enjoyable lead performance by Katy Mixon, yet her performance alone strains to sustain an excessively quirky show that relies too heavily on stereotypes." Metacritic reported a score of 60 out of 100, based on 25 critics, indicating "mixed or average reviews".

Ratings

Accolades

Controversies
In November 2017, the episode "Boo-Who?" featured character Taylor Otto dressed up as a "pregnant Norwalk prom girl", poking fun at the city of Norwalk, Connecticut, which borders the show's location of Westport. Before this incident, there were various other episodes in which Norwalk was mocked: The characters refused to swim in a Norwalk swimming pool, acting like the pool water was diseased because of Norwalk people; one of the children took bets on how many of the girlfriends of Norwalk's basketball team would be pregnant post season; and Oliver Otto used a neighbor's Hispanic housekeeper to alter flawed Polo shirts and sell them to Norwalk students, believing that no Westport resident would buy them; Oliver ended up earning a lot of money. This brought condemnation from residents, school officials, and politicians of Norwalk. After a petition calling for the producers to stop "bullying" Norwalk garnered over 500 signatures and received media coverage, a Disney spokesperson released a statement saying "As a comedy, American Housewife isn’t intended to offend anyone. We’ve heard the concerns of the people of Norwalk and have made the decision to omit any mentions of the city from future episodes".

In November 2020, Carly Hughes revealed her departure from the series resulted from a toxic work environment. In a statement, Hughes said, "I made the decision to leave to protect myself from that type of discrimination. As a Black woman in entertainment, I feel the responsibility to stand up for what I deserve, what we all deserve — to be treated equally." Allegations by Hughes and other crew members caused ABC to launch an investigation. Their findings resulted in creator Sarah Dunn no longer having an active producing role, Mark J. Greenberg stepping down as line producer, and showrunners Rick Wiener and Kenny Schwartz undergoing sensitivity training.

Notes

References

External links

2010s American single-camera sitcoms
2020s American single-camera sitcoms
2016 American television series debuts
2021 American television series endings
American Broadcasting Company original programming
English-language television shows
Television productions suspended due to the COVID-19 pandemic
Television series about families
Television series by ABC Studios
Television shows set in Connecticut
Television series by Kapital Entertainment